Miroslav Deronjić (6 June 1954 – 19 May 2007) was a Bosnian Serb who was charged with persecution, a crime against humanity, by the International Criminal Tribunal for the Former Yugoslavia (ICTY) for his actions related to the Glogova massacre in the Bosnian village of Glogova.

Deronjić held the post of President of the Bratunac Municipal Board of the Serbian Democratic Party from 1990 to 1992, and was later a member of its main board. In this role he ordered the attack on Glogova. Deronjić was arrested in Bosnia on 7 July 2002. He originally pleaded not guilty to all charges, later pleading guilty to one charge of persecution. On 30 March 2004, he was sentenced to ten years' imprisonment.

Deronjić was serving his sentence in Sweden where he died, aged 52, from cancer, in a hospital.

References

External links
 Servische oorlogscrimineel Miroslav Deronjić overleden (Dutch)
 ICTY Case Sheet re Miroslav Deronjić
 ICTY Amended Indictment re Miroslav Deronjić
 ICTY Sentencing Judgement re Miroslav Deronjić

1954 births
2007 deaths
Serbs of Bosnia and Herzegovina
People from Bratunac
People indicted by the International Criminal Tribunal for the former Yugoslavia
People convicted by the International Criminal Tribunal for the former Yugoslavia
Politicians of Republika Srpska
Serbs of Bosnia and Herzegovina convicted of crimes against humanity
Serbs of Bosnia and Herzegovina convicted of war crimes
Serb Democratic Party (Bosnia and Herzegovina) politicians
Deaths from cancer in Sweden